The 1999 DFB-Ligapokal was the third edition of the DFB-Ligapokal, and, for the third consecutive year, was won by Bayern Munich. Bayern, the previous year's League champions, beat Werder Bremen in the final, a reverse of the previous year's cup final.

Participating clubs
A total of six teams qualified for the competition. The labels in the parentheses show how each team qualified for the place of its starting round:
1st, 2nd, 3rd, 4th, etc.: League position
CW: Cup winners
TH: Title holders

Matches

Preliminary round

Semi-finals

Final

References

DFL-Ligapokal seasons
Ligapokal